The WFTDA's East Region was formed in 2006. 

In 2009, teams from the western part of the region were moved into the North Central and South Central Regions. In 2008, WFTDA changed from having just two regional tournaments (East and West), to five, made up of teams from four regions: East, North Central, South Central and West.

Members of the WFTDA's Europe Region competed in the East Region, as did members in the eastern part of the Canada Region. WFTDA has now moved away from the Big 5 WFTDA Championships qualification tournament structure, last competed in 2012.

Starting with the 2013 WFTDA season, the regions were discontinued in favour of an overall-rankings based system, and a new playoff format was created.

Member leagues

Former members

Rankings
Current Official WFTDA Regional Rankings as of January 29, 2013

Member teams unranked at this time:
 Black Rose Rollers
 Central City Roller Derby
 Charlottesville Derby Dames
 Crime City Rollers
 Diamond State Roller Girls
 Go-GO Gent Roller Derby
 Glasgow Roller Derby
 Hellions of Troy Roller Derby
 Helsinki Roller Derby
 Lincolnshire Bombers Roller Derby
 Mason-Dixon Roller Vixens
 Royal Windsor Roller Derby
 Stockholm Roller Derby

Region Champions

 2007 - Gotham Girls Roller Derby
 2008 - Gotham Girls Roller Derby
 2009 - Philly Roller Girls
 2010 - Gotham Girls Roller Derby
 2011 - Gotham Girls Roller Derby
 2012 - Gotham Girls Roller Derby

Hydra Trophy winners produced
 2008 - Gotham Girls Roller Derby
 2011 - Gotham Girls Roller Derby
 2012 - Gotham Girls Roller Derby

East Region titles won by league

See also
West Region
North Central Region
South Central Region

References

External links
 Eastern Regionals Tournament